Sevilla is a Spanish surname that originates from the city of Seville, the capital of Andalusia, Spain.

People with the surname
Óscar Sevilla, Spanish-Colombian professional road bicycle racer
Ernesto Sevilla, Spanish TV director, actor, comedian, screenwriter and TV presenter
Carmen Sevilla, Spanish actress, singer, and dancer
Gloria Sevilla, Filipina actress
Bryan Matthew Sevilla, American pornographic actor who performs under the name James Deen

References

Spanish-language surnames
Spanish toponymic surnames